Zahmatabad may refer to:
 Zahmatabad, Qaleh Ganj

See also
Zəhmətabad (disambiguation), places in Azerbaijan
Zahmatobod, the name of Ayni, Tajikistan between 1930 and 1955.